VS, Vs or vs may refer to:

Arts, entertainment and media

Film and television
 Vs (film), or All Superheroes Must Die, a 2011 horror film
 Vs. (game show), 1999
 "VS.", an episode of Prison Break

Gaming
 Vs. (video game), 1997
 Vs. System, a collectible card game
 Nintendo VS. System, an arcade system

Music
 VS (group), an English R&B and pop group
 Vs. (Cookin' on 3 Burners album), 2017
 Vs. (Mission of Burma album), 1982
 Vs. (Pearl Jam album), 1993
 VS. (Other People's Heartache Pt. III), a 2014 mixtape in the Other People's Heartache series by Bastille
 "VS" (song), a 2006 single by misono
 V.S., short for "volti subito" ("turn quickly"), an Italian musical term indicating a difficult page turn

Other uses in arts, entertainment and media
 Vs. (magazine), a fashion and lifestyle magazine
 VS (manga), by Keiko Yamada
 Vanu Sovereignty (VS), a faction in the PlanetSide series

Businesses and organizations 
 Left Socialists (Venstresocialisterne), a Danish political party
 Victoria School, an all-boys secondary school in Singapore
 Virgin Atlantic, IATA airline designator VS

People 
 V. S. Achuthanandan, Communist Leader of the Opposition of the Indian state of Kerala

Places 
 Valais, Switzerland
 Vaslui County, Romania
 Villingen-Schwenningen, Germany

Science and technology 
 Vegetative state, a wakeful unconscious state
 Microsoft Visual Studio, an integrated development environment
 Variation Selectors (Unicode block)
 VS, stall speed or minimum steady flight speed for which an aircraft is still controllable
 Visual servoing, in robot control

Other uses 
 Vajasaneyi-Samhita, text of the Yajurveda, in Hinduism
 Very Special, a classification of brandy
 Vikram Samvat, a Hindu calendar
 Vertical slice, in project management
 Holden Commodore (VS), a car

See also 
 
 
 Versus (disambiguation)
 V (disambiguation)